The Cicada Stakes is an American Thoroughbred horse race run annually at Aqueduct Racetrack in Queens, New York. Inaugurated in 1993, the Cicada Stakes was run at a distance of seven furlongs until 2006 when it was modified to six furlongs. It is a black type stakes race with a purse of $100,000 and has been a prep race to the Triple Tiara of Thoroughbred Racing, including the Kentucky Oaks, the Black-Eyed Susan Stakes and Mother Goose Stakes.

The race is named for the U.S. Racing Hall of Fame filly, Cicada. Owned by the renowned Meadow Stable of Christopher Chenery, she was voted champion two-year-old filly in 1961, champion three-year-old filly in 1962, and champion handicap filly or mare in 1963. There was no running in 2020.

Records
Speed record:
 1:09.66 @ 6 furlongs (3/4 mile): Wild Gams (2006)
 1:22.38 @ 7 furlongs (7/8 mile): Our Royal Blue (1994)

Most wins by a jockey:
 2 – Eddie Castro (2013, 2014)
 2 – Alan Garcia (2005, 2008)
 2 – Rick Wilson (1994, 2001)
 2 – Kendrick Carmouche (2017, 2022)

Most wins by a trainer:
 4 – Todd A. Pletcher (1998, 2002, 2004, 2016)

Most wins by an owner:
 2 – Shadwell Stable (2013, 2014)
 2 – William K. Warren Jr. (2008, 2010)
 2 – Zayat Stables (2009, 2018)

Winners

See also
Road to the Kentucky Oaks

References
Cicada Stakes at the NTRA

Horse races in New York City
1993 establishments in New York City
Aqueduct Racetrack
Flat horse races for three-year-old fillies
Graded stakes races in the United States
Recurring sporting events established in 1993